Hochet may refer to:

People

 Claude Hochet (1772–1857), French journalist and civil servant 
 Jules Hochet (1813–67), French industrialist
 Prosper Hochet (1810–83), French lawyer and civil servant 
 Ric Hochet, fictional hero of a Franco-Belgian comics series

Other

 Hochet, a type of Rattle (percussion instrument)
 Le Hochet, a village located in the Pamplemousses District of Mauritius